Hesychotypa nyphonoides is a species of beetle in the family Cerambycidae. It was described by Francis Polkinghorne Pascoe in 1859. It is found in Brazil, Colombia, Ecuador and Peru.

References

nyphonoides
Beetles described in 1859